Sacahuista (foaled 1984 in Kentucky) is an American Thoroughbred Champion racehorse. She is a descendant of Nearco through both her Champion sire Bold Ruler, as well as through her dam Nalees Flying Flag.

Sacahuista was purchased as a yearling for $670,000 by future National Museum of Racing and Hall of Fame inductee D. Wayne Lukas for owners Barry Beal and Lloyd French, Jr. Sacahuista made nine starts at age two, of which she won four and was second in three. Sent off as the parimutuel betting favorite in the 1986 Breeders' Cup Juvenile Fillies at Santa Anita Park under jockey Laffit Pincay, Jr., she finished fourth behind winner Brave Raj.

When she raced at age three, Sacahuista's official record shows she won two of nine starts but in fact she finished first in both the Cotillion Handicap and the Ruffian Handicap but was disqualified for interference. Under jockey Randy Romero, she then won the Grade I Spinster Stakes before capturing the Breeders' Cup Distaff at Hollywood Park Racetrack. Sacahuista's 1987 performances earned her the Eclipse Award as American Champion Three-Year-Old Filly.

Before being retired to broodmare duty, Sacahuista raced three times at age four. Her best result was a second. Of her offspring, from sire Red Ransom she notably produced millionaire runner Ekraar, who won multiple stakes races in Europe, including the Italian Group One Gran Premio del Jockey Club. Through her mating to Mr. Prospector, Sacahuista is also the dam of the successful Australian-based sire Hussonet.

References
 Sacahuista's pedigree and partial racing stats
 Video at YouTube of Sacahuista winning the 1987  Breeders' Cup Distaff and post race interview with D. Wayne Lukas

1984 racehorse births
Racehorses bred in Kentucky
Racehorses trained in the United States
Breeders' Cup Distaff winners
Eclipse Award winners
Thoroughbred family 9-f